The wattle-necked softshell turtle (Palea steindachneri), also commonly known as Steindachner's soft-shelled turtle, is an endangered Asian species of softshell turtle in the family Trionychidae. The species is the only member of the genus Palea.

Description
P. steindachneri exhibits sexual dimorphism. However, males have a longer tail than the females.

Etymology
The specific name, steindachneri, is in honor of Austrian herpetologist Franz Steindachner.

Geographic range
P. steindachneri is native to southeastern China (Guangdong, Guangxi, Guizhou, Hainan, Yunnan), Laos, and Vietnam, but has also been introduced to Hawaii and Mauritius.

Threats
P. steindachneri is endangered by poaching for human consumption. Although pressure on the wild population continues, several thousand are hatched and raised each year on turtle farms in China and Vietnam for food and traditional medicine.

References

Further reading
Meylan PA (1987). "The Phylogenetic Relationships of Soft-shelled Turtles (Family Trionychidae)". Bull. American Mus. Nat. Hist. 186 (1): 1-100. (Palea, new genus, p. 94).
Siebenrock F (1906). "Zur Kenntnis der Schildkrötenfauna der Insel Hainan ". Zoologischer Anzeiger 30: 578-586. (Trionyx steindachneri, new species, pp. 579–581). (in German).

Palea (genus)
Reptiles of China
Reptiles of Laos
Reptiles of Vietnam
Reptiles of Hawaii
Reptiles of Mauritius
Reptiles described in 1906
Critically endangered fauna of China